The Lambert-Parent House is a historic house in the village of Union City, Ohio, United States.  Built in 1881, it was initially the home of George Lambert, who founded multiple major businesses in Union City and participated in the automobile manufacturing firm founded by his brother John.  Built of brick on a stone foundation and topped with a slate roof, it is a fine example of the Italianate style of architecture and one of the most prominent structures in Union City.  Among its most distinctive architectural elements are its ornate cornices and its tall, narrow windows.

In 1980, the house was listed on the National Register of Historic Places both because of its well-preserved architecture and its connection to George Lambert.  The name "Lambert-Parent" is derived from its builder and from the Parent family, who were business associates and his relatives by marriage.

References

Houses completed in 1881
1880s architecture in the United States
Houses in Darke County, Ohio
Houses on the National Register of Historic Places in Ohio
Italianate architecture in Ohio
National Register of Historic Places in Darke County, Ohio
1881 establishments in Ohio